Wan Aadhan , is a town and Union Council of Kasur District in the Punjab province of Pakistan. It is part of Pattoki Tehsil and is located at 31°2'10N 73°55'0E with an altitude of 187 metres (616 feet).

References

Kasur District